Donald B. Dodd is an American academic and professor emeritus of history at Auburn University at Montgomery.

Dodd earned a bachelor's degree from the University of North Alabama and a master's degree from Auburn University.  He holds a Ph.D from the University of Georgia.

Following his retirement from Auburn University at Montgomery in 1995, Dodd became the administrator of the Southern Museum of Flight in Birmingham, Alabama

Dodd is the author of several books on Alabama history, including:

Winston (Jasper: Annals of Northwest Alabama, 1972)
Historical Statistics of the South (Univ. of Alabama Press, 1973)
Historical Atlas of Alabama (Univ. of Alabama Press, 1974)
Historical Statistics of the United States, (Westport, Conn., 1993)
Alabama Now & Then (The Advertiser Company, 1994)
Alabama History:An Annotated Bibliography, (Westport, Conn., 1998)
Deep South Aviation (Arcadia Publishing, 1999)
The Free State of Winston (Arcadia Publishing, 2000)
Wings of Denial:The Role of the Alabama National Guard in the Bay of Pigs (The New South, 2001)

References

Alabama Authors, The University of Alabama Libraries 

The Free State of Winston by Donald B. Dodd 

AbeBooks: Donald B. Dodd 

Living people
21st-century American historians
American male non-fiction writers
University of North Alabama alumni
Auburn University alumni
University of Georgia alumni
Auburn University at Montgomery faculty
Year of birth missing (living people)
21st-century American male writers